The 1994 FIA Formula One World Championship was the 48th season of FIA Formula One motor racing. It featured the 1994 Formula One World Championship for Drivers and the 1994 Formula One World Championship for Constructors, which were contested concurrently over a sixteen-race series that commenced on 27 March and ended on 13 November. Michael Schumacher won his first Drivers' Championship driving for Benetton, while Williams-Renault won their third consecutive Constructors' Championship, the seventh in all for Williams.

1994 was one of the most tragic and controversial seasons in the sport's history. The San Marino Grand Prix saw the deaths of Austrian rookie Roland Ratzenberger and Brazilian three-time World Champion Ayrton Senna, while a number of other incidents throughout the season resulted in injuries to drivers, mechanics, spectators and a track marshal. The FIA subsequently made sweeping changes to the rules and regulations of F1 in an effort to improve safety. 

The 1993 champion Alain Prost did not attempt to defend his title, having retired from the sport.

Forty-six drivers competed in the 1994 World Championship, including fourteen making their F1 debut, and numerous pay drivers. Mercedes-Benz returned to the sport for the first time since , as an engine supplier to Swiss team Sauber. The season also saw the first win for Ferrari since , whilst McLaren, following the departure of Senna, endured their first winless season since . 1994 was also the final season for the original Team Lotus, one of the most successful constructors in Formula One history, as well as the last Formula One season for  runner-up Michele Alboreto.

Drivers and constructors
The following teams and drivers competed in the 1994 FIA Formula One World Championship. All teams competed with tyres supplied by Goodyear.

Calendar

Calendar changes
The South African Grand Prix was dropped months after the Kyalami circuit was sold to the South African Automobile Association in July 1993 which found running a Formula One event proved too costly.

The European Grand Prix, originally scheduled for 17 April at Donington Park was cancelled and replaced by the Pacific Grand Prix which hosted its first Grand Prix in 1994. The race was held at the TI Circuit in Japan.

The Spanish Grand Prix and Monaco Grand Prix swapped places on the calendar so that the Spanish round follows the Monaco Grand Prix.

The Argentine Grand Prix had been originally scheduled for 16 October, but was cancelled on 1 June as the Autódromo Oscar Alfredo Gálvez track, which was being modernized since 1991, was still undergoing work and the owners were not finished with the project.

The European Grand Prix reappeared on the calendar as a replacement for the cancelled Argentine Grand Prix with the race being held on 16 October, the race was held at Circuito Permanente de Jerez. It was the first time since 1990 that a F1 race was held at Jerez.

Technical changes
In order to combat the spiraling costs of running a Formula One team, and to counteract criticism that over-reliance on technology was reducing the drivers to a secondary role, sweeping rule changes were introduced for 1994, most notably a ban on all electronic "driver aids"; such as active suspension, anti-lock brakes, traction control and launch control. Ayrton Senna was among several observers who said that, with such features removed but no attempt to curtail the speed of the cars, 1994 would be "a season with a lot of accidents"; ironically, Senna had been a proponent of the ban on electronic driver aids.

1994 also saw the reintroduction of refuelling during the race for the first time since . After Senna's fatal crash at Imola, several rule changes were introduced to slow the cars. In Spain, front wing endplates and rear diffusers were reduced in size. For the following race in Canada, the effectiveness of the airbox was reduced by means of holes cut into the engine cover, resulting in less power. From Germany onwards, a 10 mm wooden plank was affixed to the underside of every car to reduce ground effect advantages, whilst also forcing an increase in ride height. Wear was permitted on the plank up to 1 mm by the end of the race.

Pre-season
The big news in the paddock after the 1993 season was the retirement of defending World Champion Alain Prost after winning his fourth title, and his replacement at Williams by long-term rival Ayrton Senna. It was commonly thought that Senna's move to Williams was a factor behind Prost's retirement, which in a later interview was proved to be correct. Prost's retirement also saw the second season in succession where the reigning World Champion would not defend their title after  champion Nigel Mansell had spent 1993 racing in (and winning) the US-based Champ Car series.

 Williams retained Damon Hill to partner incoming Ayrton Senna.  Test driver David Coulthard would replace the Brazilian following his fatal accident (except at Monaco where Williams only entered Hill). Nigel Mansell took over the car of Coulthard in France and the final three races of the season. As they had done since , Williams continued to use factory Renault V10 engines.
 McLaren, having lost iconic driver Ayrton Senna to Williams, promoted Mika Häkkinen to team leader and brought in experienced Martin Brundle. Following a year with customer Ford V8 power and a brief flirtation testing the Lamborghini V12 engine, the team settled on works Peugeot V10 engines for 1994. Hakkinen was later replaced by the team's test driver, Philippe Alliot for the 1994 Hungarian Grand Prix after the Finn was suspended due to causing an accident at the 1994 German Grand Prix.
 Benetton kept Michael Schumacher as their lead driver and replaced the now retired Riccardo Patrese with Keke Rosberg's protégé JJ Lehto. The team's Dutch test-driver, Jos Verstappen, and Johnny Herbert also drove for the team during the season. The cars were powered by the new Ford ECA Zetec-R V8 engine.
 Ferrari retained their 1993 driver line-up of Jean Alesi and Gerhard Berger who drove the John Barnard designed 412T1 powered by the only V12 left in Grand Prix racing. Nicola Larini replaced Alesi for the 1994 Pacific Grand Prix and the 1994 San Marino Grand Prix due to the latter's injury in testing at Mugello.
 Sauber's Ilmor V10 engines were rebadged "Mercedes-Benz" for the 1994 season signaling the German marque's return to Formula One for the first time since , the team's driver lineup changed as they replaced JJ Lehto with German debutant Heinz-Harald Frentzen to partner Karl Wendlinger, though the Finn would return after injury plagued his time at Benetton. Andrea De Cesaris also filled Wendlinger's seat for the 1994 Spanish Grand Prix until the 1994 European Grand Prix. Lehto would return to run the final two races.
 Jordan retained their final line-up of 1993 with Rubens Barrichello, the youngest driver in the field, and Eddie Irvine. Jordan would have exclusive use of the Hart V10 engines for season. When Eddie Irvine was suspended 3 races for causing an pile-up accident in the 1994 Brazilian Grand Prix, Aguri Suzuki, who was out of drive since being released by Footwork at the end of  season, took his seat at the 1994 Pacific Grand Prix and Andrea De Cesaris (also out of drive since being dropped from Tyrrell) filled the Northern Irishman's seat for another 2 races.
 Larrousse, now powered by Ford HB V8 engines after Lamborghini pulled out of the sport, signed Olivier Beretta to partner Érik Comas. Several drivers had since replaced them during the season as 1994 would turn out to be last season for the team.
 Tyrrell retained Ukyo Katayama and replaced Andrea de Cesaris with Mark Blundell. Tyrrell had Yamaha V10 engines in their cars.
 Ligier signed returning Éric Bernard, who had been out of F1 racing since 1991 and the newcomer Olivier Panis, with both drivers from the previous year, Martin Brundle and Mark Blundell moving to McLaren and Tyrrell respectively. Like Williams, Ligier had Renault V10's at their disposal. Lotus outcast Johnny Herbert and newcomer Franck Lagorce then replaced Bernard for the remainder of the season. Martin Brundle would be returned to the team for the following year.
 Footwork faced a difficult year, having lost the Footwork sponsorship and the Mugen-Honda V10 engines. Driver line-up was also changed completely, as Christian Fittipaldi and Gianni Morbidelli joined the team to pilot the new Ford V8 powered cars.
 Lotus, despite obtaining the Mugen-Honda engine deal (their first time running Honda power since ), was also facing a difficult future restricted by financial problems. Johnny Herbert and Portuguese driver Pedro Lamy started the season, but the Lotus cars would have 6 different drivers during the 1994 season, which would turn out to be the marque's last as a going concern.

1994 saw two teams making a debut. Simtek-Ford paired Australian David Brabham, who was making his first appearance in the sport since the  season, with Austrian rookie Roland Ratzenberger. After the latter was killed at Imola, a number of other drivers took the second car. Pacific-Ilmor went for experience with Paul Belmondo and Bertrand Gachot.

Following a disastrous 1993, BMS Lola merged with Minardi, the team changing its name to BMS Minardi. Experienced Italians Michele Alboreto and Pierluigi Martini were chosen as drivers. Minardi would also use Ford HB V8 power.

Additionally, two of the top teams unveiled new colour schemes, reflecting new sponsorship deals after Camel withdrew from Formula One. Williams's new sponsorship from Rothmans saw them adopt navy and white with gold and red trim, while the Benetton team went from yellow to the pale blue and mint green of Japanese cigarette brand Mild Seven.

Race-by-race

Race 1: Brazil
The season started off in Brazil and all the native fans were supporting Senna. It was no surprise that Senna took pole ahead of Schumacher, Alesi, Hill, Frentzen and Gianni Morbidelli. At the start, Alesi took second from Schumacher while Wendlinger and Verstappen, who was driving in place of Lehto who had suffered a neck injury in testing, got ahead of Frentzen and Morbidelli. At the end of lap 1 Senna was leading Alesi, Schumacher, Hill, Wendlinger and Verstappen.

On lap 2, Schumacher took second from Alesi after a couple of unsuccessful earlier attempts. The Frenchman had been holding Schumacher up while Senna pulled out a 4-second lead. Senna and Schumacher pulled away from the rest of the pack, increasing their lead by over a second a lap. Both pitted on lap 21 but Schumacher was quicker and rejoined ahead. He pulled away to take a 10-second lead but then Senna began to reel him in. By lap 35, Verstappen, Brundle and Eddie Irvine had all got ahead of Wendlinger. As they came up to lap Éric Bernard, Verstappen tried to pass Irvine. Irvine pushed him onto the grass and Verstappen spun off, going over Irvine and tipping it into Bernard's car and then hitting Brundle, being launched into a series of barrel rolls. No-one was hurt, but Irvine was banned initially for one race, later extended to three races by the FIA after an unsuccessful appeal. By now, Alesi, who had stopped twice, was behind Hill who had only stopped once.

There was more action as both Ukyo Katayama and then Rubens Barrichello passed Wendlinger to get into the points. Both then stopped, with Barrichello getting ahead. Senna had reduced the gap to Schumacher to 5 seconds, but then spun off on lap 56, just pushing too hard. He was out. Schumacher won ahead of Hill, Alesi, Barrichello, Katayama and Wendlinger.

Race 2: Pacific (Japan)
Ferrari's Jean Alesi had injured his back in a testing crash at Mugello and was replaced by Nicola Larini who immediately caused controversy when he told the Italian media that he had used the now-banned traction control in practice, though both the team and driver later denied this. Meanwhile, Aguri Suzuki would replace Eddie Irvine for the Jordan team. Round 2 was at the new Tanaka International circuit in Japan and Senna took pole ahead of Schumacher, Hill, Häkkinen, Berger, and Brundle. At the start, Schumacher got ahead of Senna and Häkkinen got past Hill. Häkkinen tried to attack Senna but ran into the back of him. Senna spun and was hit by Larini, taking both out. Schumacher finished the lap leading Häkkinen, Hill, Berger, Barrichello, and Brundle.

Hill was frustrated at seeing Schumacher pull away and attacked Häkkinen on lap 4. Hill messed up, spun, and dropped back to ninth. He charged back up, passing Brundle on lap 12. It was time for the pit stops during which Hill got ahead of Barrichello. Häkkinen retired when his gearbox failed on lap 19.

While Schumacher pulled away, Hill closed in on Berger. During the second round of pit stops, Hill got by Berger and Brundle got by Barrichello. However, Hill retired on lap 50 when his transmission failed and Brundle also went out on lap 68 when his engine overheated. Schumacher made it two wins out of two ahead of Berger, Barrichello, Christian Fittipaldi, Frentzen, and Érik Comas.

Race 3: San Marino

Lehto was back for the San Marino Grand Prix and Andrea de Cesaris would be the second driver at Jordan. However, the weekend got off to a bad start as Rubens Barrichello had a major crash during practice and was knocked unconscious. Coming too fast into Variante Bassa, his car was launched into the air by the kerb. Less than a yard from that kerb was a tyre wall, which almost instantly stopped the car's forward motion. His car was flipped over and landed upside down. Barrichello had swallowed his tongue and his life was only saved by quick action from the medical team. He would be back at the circuit on the Saturday afternoon with a fractured nose, bandaged arm and cut lip. Barrichello has never been able to recall anything from the incident.

In qualifying, a front wing flap fell off Roland Ratzenberger's car, causing major suspension damage and worsened aerodynamics. On his next lap the front wing broke off entirely and became lodged underneath the car, causing Ratzenberger to lose control and crash into the wall at the Villeneuve kink at over 180 mph. His Simtek S941 was severely damaged, and he suffered a basal skull fracture caused by the impact and was pronounced dead at Bologna's Maggiore Hospital shortly afterwards.

After qualifying re-commenced, Senna took pole ahead of Schumacher, Berger, Hill, Lehto and Larini. During the race morning's driver meeting, all the drivers were talking about Ratzenberger's crash and were determined to improve safety for drivers, resulting in the inauguration of the Grand Prix Drivers' Association (GPDA). Senna offered to take the role of leader as he was the most senior driver.

At the start of the race, Lehto's Benetton B194 stalled and was hit by Pedro Lamy's Lotus. Debris from the crash, including Lamy's right front tyre, flew into the grandstand and injured four spectators and a policeman. Lamy was unhurt but Lehto received a light arm injury. The safety car—a sports variant of an Opel Vectra whose pace would later be criticized as being inadequate to help maintain the competitors' tyres up to temperature—was called out with Senna leading Schumacher, Berger, Hill, Frentzen and Häkkinen.

The race restarted at the end of lap 5. Senna tried immediately to pull away from Schumacher, whilst Berger in 3rd was already 2.586 seconds behind and Hill in 4th was 5.535 seconds behind. At the start of the 7th lap, Senna lost control, for reasons that are still the subject of controversy, and his car went straight on at Tamburello into an unprotected concrete wall. Telemetry shows he left the track at 310 km/h (190 mph) and was able to slow the car down by braking to 218 km/h (135 mph) in slightly under 2 seconds before hitting the wall. The suspension of the Williams broke on impact, the right front tyre flying backwards and hitting Senna on the head. The car slid to a halt on the circuit, with Senna motionless. From the helicopter pictures, a slight movement of Senna's head gave a hint of hope. Doctor Sid Watkins was on the scene in less than two minutes. Senna was airlifted to hospital but nothing could be done and Senna was pronounced dead later that evening. After the race, a moving detail was revealed when an Austrian flag was found in the Brazilian's cockpit because it is thought Senna had planned to pay tribute to Ratzenberger after the race. The race was immediately stopped after Senna's crash.

During the red flag period, the Larrousse team mistakenly released their driver Erik Comas from the pit lane, and Comas was marshalled to a stop at Tamburello corner. Commentating for Eurosport, former F1 driver John Watson described the Comas incident as the "most ridiculous incident I have seen at any time in my life, that a Grand Prix driver is allowed to exit the pits whilst the race is stopped". At the second restart, German Heinz-Harald Frentzen stopped in the Sauber and had to start from the pit lane.

When it restarted, Berger took the lead on track but Schumacher (who collided with Damon Hill, forcing the Briton in the Williams to stop for a new front wing) was still leading in the aggregate standings, with Berger, Häkkinen, Larini, Wendlinger and Katayama following. On the 12th Lap in total, Schumacher did take the lead on the circuit from Berger, but pitted immediately afterwards. When Berger stopped on lap 15, Häkkinen took the lead for McLaren. Berger retired on lap 17 with a suspension failure, whilst Häkkinen pitted a bit later, rejoining fourth. On Lap 21, Schumacher led (although driving behind Larini) on aggregate ahead of the Italian with Fittipaldi (who pitted on lap 23) in third, Häkkinen, Frentzen (who pitted a bit shorter as well) and Wendlinger making up the top six. From about lap 45 until lap 55, Damon Hill, Ukyo Katayama and Christian Fittipaldi battled for 5th, 6th and 7th, with first Fittipaldi and then Hill passing the Japanese in the Tyrrell on aggregate, Hill himself passed Fittipaldi on lap 49, only to lose the position two laps later. Fittipaldi did not finish the race; he retired with brake problems on lap 55. Damon Hill gained fifth, but lost it again to Katayama with two laps to go, and only kept a one-second lead over Heinz-Harald Frentzen to score the last point in the San Marino Grand Prix.

Another incident followed when Michele Alboreto's Minardi lost its right rear wheel while exiting the pits. Alboreto had already accelerated to a significant speed, and thus the wheel caused severe injuries to a member of the Ferrari pit crew. Alboreto's car came to a halt just outside the pits. The incident would lead to two major rule changes in Formula One:
 A pit lane speed limit of 120 km/h during the race and 80 km/h during practice and qualifying.
 Pit crews would now have to remain inside their garage until needed.
Both rules would already be imposed at the next race in Monaco and an 80 km/h speed limit is still in effect today.

Schumacher won ahead of Larini, Häkkinen, Wendlinger, Katayama and Hill but there were no celebrations on the podium and all the talk after the race centred on Senna and Ratzenberger.

Race 4: Monaco
Alesi returned as the mourning F1 field moved to Monaco where there would be more bad news as Wendlinger crashed heavily into the Nouvelle Chicane wall at high speed during the first free practice session. Quick action from the marshals saved his life but he was in a coma for three weeks, and recuperation from his head injuries ruled him out for the remainder of the season. Frentzen's Sauber was withdrawn for the Monaco event in response as a mark of respect. Schumacher took his first ever pole ahead of Häkkinen, Berger, Hill, Alesi and Fittipaldi.

On Friday morning, Niki Lauda announced the reformation of Grand Prix Drivers' Association (GPDA). The representatives elected were Niki Lauda, Michael Schumacher, Gerhard Berger and Christian Fittipaldi. Following the tragic accidents during the season the GPDA demanded the FIA improve the safety of Formula 1. The FIA responded quickly and introduced changes to the regulations as follows:

For next race, the Spanish Grand Prix,
 the size of diffusers would be reduced,
 the front wing end plates would be raised,
 the size of the front wing would be reduced.
Combined this would reduce the amount of downforce by about 15%.

For the race after that, the Canadian Grand Prix,
 the lateral protection of the drivers' heads would be improved by increasing the height of the sides of the cockpit,
 the minimum weight of a Formula 1 car would be increased by 25 kg (changed to 15 kg by Canadian GP),
 the front wishbones would be strengthened to reduce the possibility of a front wheel coming loose and striking the driver,
 the cockpit would be lengthened to prevent drivers striking their head on the front of the cockpit,
 the use of pump petrol would be introduced in a change to the fuel regulations,
 the airboxes from the engines would be removed to reduce the airflow to the engines and thus decrease the power available.

At the start, with the first two grid positions left empty and painted with the Brazilian and Austrian flags, out of respect for Senna and Ratzenberger (Williams and Simtek not fielding their second cars for the race), Hill got ahead of Berger and attacked Häkkinen into the first corner. There was contact and both spun off into the escape road and were out. Schumacher was leading ahead of Berger, Alesi, Fittipaldi, Brundle and Katayama. Schumacher pulled away while Brundle used a good strategy during the stops, pitting earlier than the others to get ahead of Fittipaldi and Alesi.

Katayama went out on lap 39 with gearbox failure and sixth place went to his teammate Mark Blundell. However, Blundell's engine failed two laps later, spreading oil across the track. Schumacher slid and nearly hit a wall while Berger went down an escape road and dropped behind Brundle. Fittipaldi retired on lap 48 with a gearbox failure. During the second stops, Andrea de Cesaris was able to get ahead of an exhausted Alesi who was struggling with neck pain. Schumacher won ahead of Brundle, Berger, de Cesaris, Alesi and Michele Alboreto.

Between the Monaco GP and the Spanish GP, Williams announced they had brought David Coulthard in to replace Senna, with Nigel Mansell deputising at those races which did not overlap with his IndyCar commitments. Alessandro Zanardi was also in at Lotus alongside Johnny Herbert as Pedro Lamy had suffered a massive testing accident at Silverstone which resulted in him sustaining two dislocated legs and a broken wrist. He would be out for the majority of the season.

Race 5: Spain
Eddie Irvine returned to Jordan after serving his 3 race ban. Sauber fielded only one car for Frentzen. A temporary tyre chicane was installed at the "Nissan" corner to reduce speeds before the "La Caixa" hairpin.

In Saturday morning's free practice session Andrea Montermini, who had replaced Ratzenberger in the Simtek, had a huge crash exiting the high-speed final corner. In light of recent events, the paddock breathed a sigh of relief when it was announced Montermini had escaped with only a broken ankle and chipped heel. Schumacher took pole ahead of Hill, Häkkinen, Lehto, Barrichello and Alesi. As Simtek and Sauber both fielded only 1 car for the race, both Pacific cars were able to qualify for the race by default as they did in Monaco.

Beretta's engine failed on the formation lap meaning the Larousse driver failed to start. Meanwhile, at the start, Alesi got ahead of both Barrichello and Lehto with Coulthard getting ahead of Barrichello as well. Schumacher led Hill, Häkkinen, Alesi, Lehto and Coulthard into lap 2. Schumacher pulled away until he began to have gear selection problems and was stuck in fifth gear. During the stops, Schumacher amazingly was able to pull away without stalling. Behind, there was action in the pits as Coulthard stalled and Alesi had troubles, dropping down four places. Schumacher, still in the lead, was struggling and was passed by Hill. During the second round of pit stops, Barrichello spun off near the pit entry and Schumacher was once again able to make a pitstop and not stall the car. Häkkinen was right with him but did not have a chance to attack as his engine failed on lap 49. Lehto took up third, but his engine failed as well five laps later. Brundle took the place, but his transmission failed with six laps to go. Hill won from Schumacher who was a superb second in the circumstances, Blundell, Alesi, Pierluigi Martini and Irvine.

Race 6: Canada
The new regulations introduced during the Monaco weekend to modify amongst other things the airboxes of the cars were now in effect and were visibly shown as teams had to cut holes in the engine covers. Another temporary chicane was installed prior to the flat-out left-right kink leading to the start-finish straight to slow the cars down. Benetton introduced a revised rear wing assembly and Ferrari had new side pods for their cars. Andrea de Cesaris was back in action, now with Sauber, and celebrated his 200th Grand Prix start.

Qualifying in Canada saw Schumacher on pole ahead of Alesi, Berger, Hill, Coulthard and Barrichello. At the start, Coulthard surprised Hill and Häkkinen got ahead of Barrichello. Schumacher led from Alesi, Berger, Coulthard, Hill and Häkkinen. Hill passed Coulthard on lap 4 but Coulthard retook the place on the outside. Coulthard waved Hill through on lap 9. Hill now set off after Berger, passing him on lap 15.

During the stops, Hill got by Alesi with Häkkinen getting ahead of Coulthard. Häkkinen closed up on Berger but was unable to pass. Although it began to rain on lap 40, still there were no major changes at the top, with the top 6 remaining unaltered. On lap 62, Häkkinen's engine blew up, putting him out. On the last lap, Barrichello and Blundell were fighting for sixth when they collided, with Blundell beached in the gravel trap and Barrichello dropping behind Fittipaldi and Lehto. Fittipaldi was, however, disqualified for an underweight car, giving sixth to Lehto. Schumacher won ahead of Hill, Alesi, Berger, Coulthard and Lehto.

The Canadian GP was the last time in 1994 that the Pacific team qualified for a race. Bertrand Gachot retired after 47 laps with oil pressure problems. For the rest of the season the woefully slow cars would fail to even make the grid.

Race 7: France
France was the venue for the next Grand Prix and Mansell was going to race for Williams as it would not interfere with his CART racing. Benetton had relegated Lehto to the third driver and given the second seat behind Schumacher to Verstappen. Frenchman Jean-Marc Gounon took the second Simtek seat alongside David Brabham. The Williams team took a 1–2 in qualifying with Hill on pole ahead of Mansell, Schumacher, Alesi, Berger and Irvine. At the start, Schumacher showed class to slice between both Williams to take the lead while Barrichello got ahead of Irvine. Schumacher led ahead of Hill, Mansell, Alesi, Berger and Barrichello.

Schumacher pulled away as usual with Hill unable to keep up. During the stops, Alesi got ahead of Mansell and Berger got by Barrichello. Berger then passed Mansell on lap 24. The order settled down at Schumacher, Hill, Alesi, Berger, Mansell and Barrichello. Alesi soon pitted, dropping to fifth. He then spun on lap 42, and was hit by Barrichello as he tried to rejoin, taking both out.

Mansell was planning only to stop twice and took third when Berger pitted but retired on lap 46 when his transmission failed. Häkkinen, now fourth, retired two laps later with a blown engine. There were no changes in the third round of stops although Katayama spun off from fifth soon after, on lap 54. Schumacher won once again from Hill, Berger, Frentzen, Martini and de Cesaris.

Race 8: Great Britain
Hill took pole position in front of his home crowd in Britain ahead of Schumacher, Berger, Alesi, Häkkinen and Barrichello. There was controversy as Schumacher passed Hill on the parade lap, not permitted under the regulations, and then let him resume first position before they came back to the grid to form up. The first start was aborted when Coulthard (returning to the Williams team) stalled on the grid and was forced to start from the back. Irvine retired on the second parade lap with engine problems and at the second start, Brundle's engine blew in a ball of fire. At the start, Barrichello was the man on the move, getting by Alesi and Häkkinen. Hill led Schumacher, Berger, Barrichello, Alesi and Häkkinen.

Hill and Schumacher stayed together, separated by two seconds until lap 14, when Schumacher was given a five-second stop-go penalty for passing Hill on the parade lap. The team told him to ignore this as they were appealing the decision.  Schumacher stayed out beyond the three laps required to adhere to the penalty, and was then shown the black flag meaning he was excluded from the race and from that point would have to return to the pits and retire. Benetton, however, continued to negotiate and appeal the decision with race officials.  Schumacher did return to the pits on lap 26, but only for the five-second stop-go penalty. He re-joined the race in third behind Berger and Hill.

On lap 33, Berger went out with an engine failure.  Hill won with Schumacher second, but Schumacher was disqualified for ignoring the black flag and was banned for two races. This meant that Hill kept his win ahead of Alesi, Häkkinen, Barrichello, Coulthard, and Katayama. Häkkinen and Barrichello received a 1 race suspended ban for a collision between the two on the final lap of the race.

Thus, at the halfway stage of the championship, Schumacher was well ahead of the field with 66 points. Hill was a distant second with 39, Alesi third with 19, Berger fourth with 17, Barrichello fifth with 10, Häkkinen sixth with 8, Brundle seventh with 6 and Larini eighth with 6. In the Constructors' Championship, Benetton were comfortably ahead with 67 points, 24 points ahead of Williams with 43. Ferrari were also right there, just a single point behind with 42, with McLaren fourth with 14.

Benetton had appealed against Schumacher's ban and he was able to race while the decision was pending.

Race 9: Germany
The second half of the season started in Germany but the Schumacher fans went home disappointed as the Ferraris locked out the front row in qualifying. Berger took pole ahead of Alesi, Hill, Schumacher down in fourth, Katayama and Coulthard. At the start Katayama got ahead of Hill and Schumacher and then Schumacher got by Hill. There was mayhem behind as Häkkinen hit Brundle and spun off, taking out Frentzen, Barrichello and Irvine, as well as knocking Coulthard's front wing out of place. Brundle braked to avoid the mess but was hit by Herbert, taking Herbert out. Behind, there was a collision between Martini and Alessandro Zanardi, taking out de Cesaris and Alboreto in the process. A total of 10 cars were out by the first corner. Surprisingly, the race was not red-flagged.

On the run down to the first chicane Alesi slowed with an electrical problem and retired in the pits, but also blocked Katayama, allowing both Schumacher and Hill to attack. Schumacher went through but Hill hit Katayama, damaging his front suspension. Coulthard pitted for a new wing and Hill double-stacked behind him to get his suspension checked. Brundle, Coulthard and Hill rejoined after repairs as Berger was leading from Schumacher, Katayama, Olivier Panis, Bernard and Fittipaldi. Katayama retired on lap 7 with throttle troubles as Verstappen passed Fittipaldi. It was time for the stops and Verstappen retired following a fire as fuel spilled onto the bodywork of the car. He managed to escape relatively uninjured but the car was reduced to a smoldering wreck. The incident served to highlight the dangers of refuelling now it had been re-introduced to the sport, and paved the way for future safety measures. Schumacher retired on lap 20 with an engine failure.

With most of the major players out or far down the order after incidents, Berger took an emotional win which he dedicated to his friend Senna. A race of attrition saw some unfamiliar faces in the top six. Both Ligiers of Panis and Bernard finished on the podium, Fittipaldi and Morbidelli collected valuable points for Footwork and Comas picked up the final point for Larrousse.

Race 10: Hungary
The news before Hungary was that Häkkinen had been banned for one race for causing the pile-up in Germany and was replaced by Philippe Alliot. Schumacher was on pole ahead of Hill, Coulthard, Berger, Katayama and Brundle. At the start Irvine and Barrichello were quick and got ahead of Brundle and Katayama.

However, they collided into the second corner and took off Katayama as well. Schumacher led Hill, Coulthard, Berger, Brundle and Panis. Early on, Alesi passed Panis for sixth. Nothing changed as the order settled down, with the first round of stops leaving the same order. Finally, there was action behind as Berger stalled during the second round of pit stops and dropped behind Brundle, Alesi and Verstappen.

Both Ferrari engines then failed; Alesi's on lap 59 and Berger's on lap 73. Alesi's engine left oil on the track, and Coulthard spun on it into the wall. On the last lap, Brundle stopped with an electrical failure. Schumacher won from Hill, Verstappen, Brundle, Blundell and Panis.

Controversy surrounded Benetton following the Verstappen pit-fire at Hockenheim. The team was summoned to appear before the World Motorsport council on 19 October 1994, to explain why a filter had been removed from the refuelling rig. If found guilty, the team would be excluded from the championship, but they were acquitted. McLaren were also in the dock over the use of a fully automatic upchange device. They were also acquitted.

Race 11: Belgium
The most notable aspect of this race was the alteration of the Eau Rouge corner into a slow chicane, due to safety fears after the Senna/Ratzenberger accidents. This was achieved simply by painting new boundary lines onto the track, with the original layout restored for 1995.

Häkkinen was back in Belgium after the ban, Philippe Adams replaced Zanardi at Lotus and Philippe Alliot moved from McLaren duties to replace Beretta at Larrousse. Rain in qualifying resulting in a scrambled grid order with Barrichello on pole from Schumacher, Hill, Irvine, Alesi and Verstappen. At the start Alesi was on the move, quickly getting ahead of Irvine and Hill. Schumacher took the lead on the run up the hill with Alesi following him to second soon after and Verstappen then passing Irvine. Schumacher led Alesi, Barrichello, Hill, Verstappen and Irvine.

Hill passed Barrichello for third and this became second when Alesi's engine failed on the next lap. Soon Häkkinen passed Irvine but Coulthard dropped back while trying to follow him through. Barrichello was passed by Verstappen and then Häkkinen attacked him. Barrichello cracked under the pressure and spun off on lap 20 into the wall, ending his race. On the next lap, Schumacher had a 360 degree spin at Pouhon, and his lead was significantly reduced when he rejoined. He kept a five-second lead during the stops in which Häkkinen got ahead of Verstappen.

On lap 35, Coulthard passed Irvine, who then retired on lap 41 with three laps to go, with an alternator failure. Schumacher took the chequered flag, but was disqualified after the race because the wooden stepped flat bottom board on Schumacher's car had been excessively worn away, more than the permitted 10% wear. Hill was reclassified as the winner ahead of Häkkinen, Verstappen, Coulthard, Blundell and Morbidelli.

Schumacher's ban (handed down after the British Grand Prix) stood after appeal and he would miss Italy and Portugal. He was replaced by Lehto.

Race 12: Italy
Driver swapping continued as Zanardi got his seat back from Adams for Monza and Yannick Dalmas was back after almost 4 years absence, now partnering Comas at Larrousse. In Italy, the Ferrari fans were sent wild as their drivers took another 1–2 in qualifying, Alesi on pole ahead of Berger and Hill. Johnny Herbert qualified an unexpected fourth in the new Lotus 109 and was followed by Coulthard and Panis. At the start, Herbert and Irvine got ahead of the Williams but Irvine hit Herbert and Herbert spun, causing mayhem behind and a red flag. The second start was uneventful with Coulthard getting ahead of Herbert and Häkkinen getting ahead of Panis. Alesi led Berger, Hill, Coulthard, Herbert and Häkkinen.

While the Ferraris pulled away (Alesi pulling away from Berger), Häkkinen passed Herbert (in the spare Lotus, an older car) who retired on lap 13 when his alternator failed. Alesi then pitted but his car refused to engage a gear when he tried to rejoin resulting in his retirement. During Berger's stop, he was blocked by another car which was going into the pit. In his frustration, he accidentally stalled the car exiting his stop and lost over 10 seconds, dropping back to third. Coulthard also got ahead of Hill during the stops, however Hill passed Coulthard on lap 29 to take the lead.

Berger was closing in on them both, however the Williamses held him off and looked set to finish 1–2 until Coulthard slowed dramatically, as he ran out of fuel on the last lap. Hill won from Berger, Häkkinen, Barrichello, Brundle and Coulthard, who was classified sixth.

Eddie Irvine was given a one-race ban suspended for three races for his behaviour in the first corner incident at the first start.

With three-quarters of the season gone, Schumacher who had served one race of his two-race ban led the championship with 76 points, but Hill, second with 65 points was just 11 points behind. Berger was third with 33, Alesi fourth with 19, Häkkinen fifth with 18, Barrichello sixth with 13, Brundle seventh with 11 and Verstappen eighth with 8. In the Constructors' Championship, Benetton led with 85 points but Williams were hot on their heels with 73. Ferrari were not too far behind with 58, and McLaren fourth with 29.

Race 13: Portugal
Schumacher was still banned as the field went to Portugal. Philippe Adams had another go in the financially struggling Lotus. In qualifying, Berger took pole ahead of Hill, Coulthard, Häkkinen, Alesi and Katayama. At the start, Coulthard got ahead of Hill and Alesi was ahead of Häkkinen. Berger was leading Coulthard, Hill, Alesi, Häkkinen, and Katayama. Berger only lasted until lap 8 when his gearbox failed, promoting Barrichello to the points. Just before the stops, Katayama's gearbox also failed, on lap 27.

The stops did not change the order, with Coulthard leading ahead of Hill, Alesi, Häkkinen, Barrichello and Brundle. Coulthard went wide while lapping a backmarker on lap 33, and Hill edged ahead. On lap 39, when Alesi was coming up to lap David Brabham, they collided and both were out. Soon afterwards, Verstappen passed Brundle to take fifth. The second round of stops did not change anything. Hill won with Coulthard second, giving Williams a 1–2 and the lead in the Constructors' Championship, ahead of Häkkinen, Barrichello, Verstappen, and Brundle.

Race 14: Europe
To the new race in Jerez and there was major news. Schumacher was back after his ban, and with the CART season finished, Mansell replaced Coulthard for the remainder of the season in order to help Williams in the Constructors battle. Johnny Herbert was moved from Lotus to Ligier in place of Eric Bernard, who travelled the opposite way to partner Zanardi. Two new faces arrived at the back of the grid, as Hideki Noda joined Larrousse and Domenico "Mimmo" Schiattarella replaced Jean-Marc Gounon at Simtek. Schumacher took pole ahead of Hill, Mansell, Frentzen, Berger and Barrichello. At the start, Hill took the lead from Schumacher while Mansell went backwards, losing three places with Barrichello getting ahead of Berger. Hill led from Schumacher, Frentzen, Barrichello, Berger and Mansell.

Mansell quickly passed Berger and then Barrichello to get up to fourth. During the stops, Hill messed up and the team, afraid that he would lose the lead, sent him back out too quickly without giving him enough fuel. Schumacher however was already ahead and Hill had to stop again for fuel. When he rejoined, he was over 20 seconds behind. Mansell too was slow and Barrichello was ahead of him. Mansell tried to pass him and there was contact. Both had to pit, with Mansell dropping to seventh and Barrichello going well down.

The result was the same when Berger attacked Frentzen but damage was minor. They rejoined in sixth and seventh, behind Häkkinen, Irvine and Mansell, with Berger ahead. Mansell, now fifth, spun off on lap 48 into retirement while trying to close the gap to Irvine. Schumacher won ahead of Hill, Häkkinen, Irvine, Berger and Frentzen.

With just two more races to go, there was a major battle for the Drivers' Championship. Schumacher led the championship with 86 points, but Hill was right behind with 81. Berger was third with 35, Häkkinen fourth with 26, Alesi fifth with 19, Barrichello sixth with 16, Coulthard seventh with 14 and Brundle eighth with 12. The Constructors' Championship was even closer as Benetton led with 97 points and Williams a mere 2 points behind with 95. Ferrari were third with 60, while McLaren were fourth with 38.

Race 15: Japan
More driver roulette followed before Japan. Benetton signed up Herbert from Ligier, in order to help them in the Constructors battle. This left Verstappen out of a drive for the last two races. JJ Lehto landed the Sauber seat for the remaining two races, vacated by Andrea de Cesaris who retired from the sport. Finn Mika Salo joined Lotus for the remainder of the season, Frenchman Franck Lagorce was promoted from Ligier test duties to race alongside Panis and Japanese driver Taki Inoue replaced Schiattarella for his home race. Mercedes-Benz ended months of speculation and confirmed their return to Formula 1 as an engine supplier for McLaren. Eddie Jordan immediately picked up a Peugeot works engine deal for his team for 1995.

Schumacher took pole ahead of Hill, Frentzen, Mansell, Herbert and Irvine. At the start the track was wet and it was raining heavily. Mansell went backwards again with Alesi getting ahead of Irvine. Schumacher was leading Hill, Frentzen, Herbert, Alesi and Irvine. Herbert spun off on lap 4 and retired, while Mansell soon passed Irvine.

On lap 14, Morbidelli crashed, and Brundle crashed off shortly after at the same point whilst the marshalls were still dealing with Morbidelli's car. Although no-one was hit by the car, one marshall was hit by debris and suffered a broken leg; the race was stopped. The race restarted after some time behind the Safety Car and Frentzen ran wide into the first corner, dropping down three places. Schumacher, who was just ahead on track but 6 seconds ahead on aggregate pitted early on lap 19. He took on fresh tyres and a fuel load that was insufficient to last to the end of the race. He rejoined 17 seconds behind Hill on aggregate but got caught in traffic and soon the gap was up to 30 seconds before it stabilized. This meant that Hill rejoined 7 seconds ahead on lap 25 when he pitted and fueled to the end of the race, but only 3 of his tyres were changed due to a sticking wheel nut. This, coupled with Hill's heavy fuel load appeared to hinder him and Schumacher began to close in.

On lap 36, Schumacher took the lead on aggregate, though he was still behind on the track. He pulled away rapidly, but he needed to pit again whereas Hill did not. On lap 40 Schumacher made his second stop, rejoining 15 seconds behind Hill on aggregate. Renowned for his ability in the wet and on fresher tyres, Schumacher closed in on Hill at a rate of over a second a lap, but ran out of time to catch him. Hill won by 3.3s to reduce his deficit in the Drivers' Championship to 1 point, as well as giving Williams a 5-point lead in the Constructors' Championship going into the last race, ahead of Schumacher, Alesi, Mansell, Irvine, and Frentzen.

Race 16: Australia
For the final race of the season Jean-Denis Délétraz replaced Erik Comas at Larrousse and Schiattarella was back with Simtek after Taki Inoue's one-off deal at Suzuka. Peter Sauber confirmed a deal with a Ford engine for 1995.

Both championships were going to be decided in Australia and Mansell took pole ahead of Schumacher, Hill, Häkkinen, Barrichello, and Irvine. At the start, Mansell dropped backwards as was proving usual, with Irvine getting ahead of Barrichello, leaving the front six as Schumacher, Hill, Häkkinen, Irvine, Mansell, and Barrichello. Schumacher and Hill, separated by a second, pulled away at an astonishing rate from the rest of the field.

Mansell took fourth from Irvine on lap 10 and six laps later, Irvine spun off into the wall and retired. It did not take long for Mansell to pass Häkkinen but even then he was lapping over a second slower than Schumacher and Hill. During the stops, Schumacher and Hill stayed just over a second apart, while, behind, Berger got ahead of Alesi and both got ahead of Barrichello. Soon Berger passed Häkkinen, with Alesi following him through three laps later.

On lap 35, Schumacher went wide at the East Terrace corner and brushed the wall. He lost time but at the time, it was unclear whether his car was damaged or not. Hill was suddenly right behind him and saw his chance to pass, taking the inside line into the next corner. As Hill's Williams drew alongside the Benetton, Schumacher appeared to turn in aggressively and there was contact between the two rival cars. The Benetton was then momentarily flung into the air and was damaged badly enough to mean immediate retirement for the German. Hill's car initially appeared to be undamaged but it was soon apparent the Briton's front left wishbone was broken. Hill toured back slowly to the pits and after some time trying to repair the damage, retired. Whether this accident had been deliberately caused by Schumacher – in the knowledge he had damaged his car in running wide at the East Terrace Corner – remains a matter of some debate, however it handed Michael Schumacher the first of his seven FIA Formula One World Championships.

Mansell and the two Ferraris fought for the lead, but Alesi lost a full lap and dropped down to eighth during the second round of stops because of trouble fixing a tyre and then stalling his car while trying to leave. Behind, Brundle got ahead of Barrichello. On lap 77, Häkkinen's brakes failed, sending him into the wall and into retirement. Mansell took his 31st (and final) career win ahead of Berger, Brundle, Barrichello, Panis, and Alesi.

Thus, at the end of the season, Schumacher with 92 points pipped Hill on 91 by just one point. Controversy and speculation was abound about this result, however the FIA took no action as Williams, who were still dealing with Senna's death, did not protest. Berger came third with 41, Häkkinen fourth with 26, Alesi fifth with 24, Barrichello sixth with 19, Brundle seventh with 16, and Coulthard eighth with 14. In the Constructors' Championship, Williams with 118 points beat Benetton with 103. Ferrari were third with 71, and McLaren were fourth with 42.

Results and standings

Grands Prix

Points scoring system

Points were awarded to the top six finishers in each race as follows:

World Drivers' Championship standings

Notes:
 – Driver did not finish the Grand Prix but was classified, as he completed more than 90% of the race distance.

World Constructors' Championship standings

 

Notes:
 – Driver did not finish the Grand Prix but was classified, as he completed more than 90% of the race distance.

See also

1994 Formula One cheating controversy
Death of Ayrton Senna

Notes

References

Bibliography

External links

formula1.com – 1994 official driver standings (archived)
formula1.com – 1994 official team standings (archived)

Formula One seasons